Jose Sambu or Coró is a Bissau-Guinean-born Portuguese former footballer who played as a defender.

Career  
Sambu played in the Primeira Divisão in 1963 with Lusitano Évora. The following season he played in the Segunda Divisão with A.D. Sanjoanense. He returned to his former club Lusitano Évora in 1965. In 1971, he played abroad in the National Soccer League with Toronto First Portuguese. In July, 1971 he was loaned to the Toronto Metros of the North American Soccer League because of a player shortage due to inquires. He made one appearance for the Metros during his short stint. 

He re-signed with Toronto First Portuguese for the 1972 season. In the winter of 1973 he played at the indoor level with Toronto Portuguese in the Toronto Indoor Soccer League.

References  
 

Year of birth missing
Association football defenders
Bissau-Guinean footballers
Portuguese footballers
Portuguese expatriate footballers
Lusitano G.C. players
A.D. Sanjoanense players
Toronto First Portuguese players
Toronto Blizzard (1971–1984) players
Primeira Liga players
Segunda Divisão players
Canadian National Soccer League players
North American Soccer League (1968–1984) players
Expatriate soccer players in Canada
Portuguese expatriate sportspeople in Canada